The  of the Geological Survey of Japan opened in Tsukuba, Ibaraki Prefecture, Japan in 1980. The collection totals some 150,000 rock, mineral, and fossil specimens, amassed during the activities of the Survey since its establishment in 1882, of which around 2,000 are on display at any one time.

See also
 Ibaraki Prefectural Museum of History

References

External links
  Geological Museum
  Geological Museum

Museums in Ibaraki Prefecture
Geology museums in Japan
Tsukuba, Ibaraki
Museums established in 1980
1980 establishments in Japan